John A. Peavey (born June 6, 1963) is a former American football player and coach.  He served as the head football coach at William Paterson University from 1997 to 1999 and at Southwest Baptist University from 2005 to 2006, compiling a career college football record of 9–43.  Peavey played professionally in the National Football League (NFL) with the New England Patriots and the Denver Broncos.

Coaching career
Peavey had great success as high school football coach with a record of 44–4–2. In four seasons as the head coach at Bishop Feehan High School in Attleboro, Peavey led the Shamrocks to four state championship title games and won three of them in a row. The Shamrocks were also league champions all four years. Peavey also helped lead Foxboro High School to back to back state championships.

Collegiately, Peavey is a former head football coach for the William Paterson University Pioneers football team in Wayne Township, New Jersey. He served for three years, 1997 to 1999, and compiled a 5–25 overall record (1–14 conference). A highlight during this otherwise unsuccessful campaign was leading the Pioneers to their first road win in 25 games and their first home victory in three years. In 1998, his offense led the conference in rushing. Peavey's only other collegiate head coaching job was at Southwest Baptist University, where he spent the 2005 and 2006 seasons. In two years, he compiled a 4–18 record, and then resigned in July 2007.

Head coaching record

College

Athletic Administration
Jack Peavey was Named Athletic Director for New Sports and Director of Football at Oklahoma Baptist University in 2012.  Peavey was charged with the  responsible to starting men and woman's swimming and diving.  He was charged with bringing Women's lacrosse to campus and he was directly responsible for  reading the campus as it was committed to bringing football back to the University's campus in Shawnee Oklahoma. In Peavey's first hire he persuaded Legendary swim coach  Dr. Sam Freas to come to Shawnee and lead Bison Swimming.  Sam was most recently the Director of the International Swimming Hall of Fame for 19 years. Dr. Freas quickly showed the NAIA he was here to put OBU Swimming on the map.  Sam Freas led Bison Swimming teams to win 7 of 8 National Championship titles in his first 4 seasons at the helm.  Dr. Freas started the OBU program competing in the NAIA and then Dr. Freas helped the transition to the NCAA Division II.

As the Director of Football Peavey's responsibility was to find a coach and get the campus ready to start football.  Oklahoma Baptist had not had football on campus since 1940.  Peavey oversight was directed at building a complete infrastructure.  He prepared the campus practice facility, laundry facility, locker room, weight room, offices, New Stadium, score board, recruiting and hiring of the football staff.   Oklahoma Baptist hired Chris Jensen to lead the programs and in the just the programs second season Oklahoma Baptist University football went 8-3.  

Peavey also became the Director of the  Bison Recreation and Wellness Center.  The 59,500 square ft. building includes a full-service fitness center, student leisure recreation lobby and seating area, 3 full size hardwood basketball courts, 2 group fitness exercise studios/multipurpose rooms, an elevated track (1/10th mile lap), 29 ft. indoor climbing wall, 3 racquetball courts, shower and locker rooms, and event room.  The RAWC serves over 2,800 members within the OBU community and hosts multiple sport tournaments and climbing competitions. The swimming facility was also home to Bison Swimming.  The Recreation and Wellness Center is home to OBU's Intramural and Club Sports programs and facilitates the use of the OBU intramural fields and outdoor sand volleyball courts.

External links
 

1963 births
Living people
American football offensive linemen
Alabama State Hornets football coaches
Arkansas Razorbacks football coaches
Brown Bears football coaches
Denver Broncos players
Jacksonville State Gamecocks football coaches
Millersville Marauders football coaches
Millsaps Majors football coaches
Mississippi College Choctaws football coaches
New England Patriots players
Rhode Island Rams football coaches
Southwest Baptist Bearcats football coaches
Texas A&M–Commerce Lions football coaches
Troy Trojans football players
William Paterson Pioneers football coaches
High school football coaches in Massachusetts
People from Attleboro, Massachusetts
Coaches of American football from Massachusetts
Players of American football from Massachusetts